Stanford Park is a  biological Site of Special Scientific Interest east of Swinford in Leicestershire.

The park has avenues of oak trees, together with other large trees in an area of pasture. It has the most diverse lichens in the county on the bark of mature trees and on old stonework, including fifteen species not recorded elsewhere in Leicestershire.

The park is the grounds of Stanford Hall, a stately home which is open to the public.

References

Sites of Special Scientific Interest in Leicestershire